Pablo Valenzuela (born June 13, 1941) is a Chilean biochemist dedicated to biotechnology development. He is known for his genetic studies of hepatitis viruses; participated as R&D Director in the discovery of hepatitis C virus and the invention of the world's first recombinant vaccine (against hepatitis B virus). He is one of the cofounders of the biotechnology company Chiron Corporation and of Fundacion Ciencia para la Vida, a private non profit institution where he is currently working.

Biography
Pablo Valenzuela studied biochemistry at Universidad de Chile and earned his Ph.D. degree (1970) in Chemistry at Northwestern University, did a postdoctoral training at University of California, San Francisco and held a position as Professor in the Biochemistry Department of that institution. In 1981, together with William J. Rutter and Edward Penhoet founded the biotechnology company Chiron Corporation that in 1997 was the second-largest biotechnology company in the world, after Amgen. As Research Director Pablo Valenzuela developed a variety of biotechnological products, specially in the blood banking industry. The invention of the recombinant vaccine against Hepatitis B virus was chosen by Business Week as one of the three most innovative technological products of the year 1986. In Chile Pablo Valenzuela founded Bios Chile, the first biotechnology company in that country, and in 1997 together with Bernardita Mendez he cofounded Fundacion Ciencia Para la Vida a non profit foundation that carries out scientific and technological research. He is the father of Chilean American singer/songwriter, Francisca Valenzuela.

Work
Pablo Valenzuela is the scientist responsible for the development of biotechnology products in USA and Chile in the area of international diagnostics, blood banking and pharmaceutical.  He is cofounder and responsible of early activities of biotechnology Start-ups in USA and Chile. He is also Professor and Investigator in graduate programs, generating scientific publications and patents.

Valenzuela was recipient of the Chilean National Prize for Applied Sciences and Technologies in 2002 and is a member of the Chilean Academy of Sciences. He was awarded the UCSF medal in 2014.

Science & technology developments in USA
 Cofounder of Chiron Corporation.
 Ten products in the area of international diagnostics and blood banking (Hepatitis C, AIDS, Hepatitis B) that have been commercialized by Chiron Corporation, Abbott and Johnson & Johnson.
 Four products in the pharmaceutical area (Hepatitis B vaccine, human insulin, beta-interferon and a wound healing gel based on PDGF) and one product for the food industry (bovine rennin), commercialized worldwide by Chr. Hansen.

Science & technology developments in Chile 
 Co-Founder and President of Bios Chile and Austral Biologicals.
 Co-Founder and Director of Fundación Ciencia para la Vida.
 Co-Founder and President of Andes Biotechnologies (start-up 2009).
 Biotechnology products, like vaccines for the salmon aquiculture,  licensed to Novartis.
 Products for human health and blood banking (Chagas, H. pylori, rotavirus, blood tests).
 Responsible Director of the Millennium Institute for Fundamental and Applied Biology, one of 15 centers of excellence in Chile.

References

External links 
 Fundacion Ciencia para la Vida
Pablo Valenzuela's Short Talk: "Life Sciences in Chile" (also in Spanish)

1941 births
Living people
Biochemists
Chilean scientists
University of California, San Francisco alumni